Grieves is the surname of:

 James Grieves (born 1974), Scottish speedway rider
 Ken Grieves (1925–1992), Australian–English football goalkeeper and cricketer

See also
 Grieves (born 1984), American hip hop artist
 Greaves (surname)
 Greeves (surname)
 Grieve (surname)